Rose-Marie Pepe (born 23 April 1954) is a Canadian swimmer. She competed in the women's 200 metre breaststroke at the 1972 Summer Olympics.

References

External links
 

1954 births
Living people
Canadian female breaststroke swimmers
Olympic swimmers of Canada
Swimmers at the 1972 Summer Olympics
Swimmers at the 1971 Pan American Games
Pan American Games competitors for Canada
Swimmers from Vancouver
20th-century Canadian women